Platyceps elegantissimus is a species of snake of the family Colubridae. It is commonly known as the elegant racer.

Geographic range
The snake is found in the Middle East.

References 

Reptiles described in 1878
Taxa named by Albert Günther
Reptiles of the Middle East
Snakes of Jordan
Platyceps